Carmen E. Espinosa is a former Justice of the Connecticut Supreme Court. She became a Senior Justice on July 16, 2017.

Education
Espinosa received her Juris Doctor from The George Washington University Law School; Master of Arts in Hispanic Studies from Brown University and a Bachelor of Science Degree in Secondary Education with a major in Spanish and French from Central Connecticut State University.

See also
List of Hispanic/Latino American jurists

References

External links

Living people
Assistant United States Attorneys
Brown University alumni
Central Connecticut State University alumni
Justices of the Connecticut Supreme Court
George Washington University Law School alumni
Superior court judges in the United States
Year of birth missing (living people)
21st-century American judges
21st-century American women judges
Hispanic and Latino American judges